Koy-Tash is a village in the Alamüdün District of Chüy Region of Kyrgyzstan. Its population was 2,736 in 2021.

References

Populated places in Chüy Region